Nepotilla fenestrata is a species of sea snail, a marine gastropod mollusk in the family Raphitomidae.

Description
The length of the shell attains 4 mm, its diameter 1.5 mm.

(Original description) The delicate, white shell contains 5 whorls, including a rather blunt scarcely mamillate protoconch of 2 convex whorls, with 7 spiral lirae, ending abruptly at the first axial rib. The whorls of the spire are gradate, subconcavely sloping below the suture, with a sharp lira at the edge of the gradation. The whorls contract towards the lower suture. The body whorl is contracted at the base. The siphonal canal is very short. The aperture is oblong-oval. The outer lip is thin, with ten lirae outside, which with the lip in profile project as minute spurs. The sinus is well marked from the suture to the angle. The inner lip shows a narrow, opaque-white glaze. The  columella is long, straightly convex. The sculpture consists of bold, five spirals in the first and second whorls, including that at the angle, fourteen on the body whorl, narrow, erect. The axials, twenty in the penultimate, coronate the uppermost spiral with projecting points, and produce tiny tubercles as they cross the other spirals. Crowded
axial threads, concave forwards, run from the simple suture to the angle.

Distribution
This marine species is endemic to Australia and occurs off South Australia and Tasmania

References

 Verco, J.C. 1909. Notes on South Australian marine Mollusca with descriptions of new species. Part XII. Transactions of the Royal Society of South Australia 33: 293–342
 May, W.L. 1923. An illustrated index of Tasmanian shells: with 47 plates and 1052 species. Hobart : Government Printer 100 pp.* Powell, A.W.B. 1966. The molluscan families Speightiidae and Turridae, an evaluation of the valid taxa, both Recent and fossil, with list of characteristic species. Bulletin of the Auckland Institute and Museum. Auckland, New Zealand 5: 1–184, pls 1–23 
 Cotton, B.C. 1959. South Australian Mollusca. Archaeogastropoda. Handbook of the Flora and Fauna of South Australia. Adelaide : South Australian Government Printer 449 pp.

External links
  Hedley, C. 1922. A revision of the Australian Turridae. Records of the Australian Museum 13(6): 213-359, pls 42-56 
 
 Grove, S.J. (2018). A Guide to the Seashells and other Marine Molluscs of Tasmania: Nepotilla fenestrata

fenestrata
Gastropods described in 1909
 Gastropods of Australia